Hypsirhynchus ater, the Jamaican giant racer or Jamaican racer, is a species of snake in the family Colubridae.  The species is native to Jamaica.

References

Hypsirhynchus
Reptiles of Jamaica
Endemic fauna of Jamaica
Taxa named by Philip Henry Gosse
Reptiles described in 1851